Mary Mac's Tea Room is a restaurant in Atlanta, Georgia, serving Southern cuisine. The restaurant is located in the Midtown district at 224 Ponce de Leon Avenue NE. The current owner is Harold Martin Jr.

History
Mary MacKenzie opened the restaurant in 1945. Just after World War II, enterprising women in search of a living, many of them widowed by the war, were establishing restaurants throughout Atlanta. Calling their establishments "tea rooms" was a polite way of elevating their endeavor. The restaurant is known for continuing the cooking traditions of MacKenzie and her successor, Margaret Lupo, who owned the Tea Room from 1962 until 1994. The restaurant was mentioned in the Designing Women episode The Women of Atlanta, wherein Julia (Dixie Carter) made mention of "The Blue-haired ladies that play Bridge over at Mary Mac's Tea Room" as a possible photographic subject for a magazine.

Cuisine
Mary Mac's serves classic Southern cuisine.

See also

Culture of Atlanta
List of Southern restaurants
Tourism in Atlanta

References

External links 
Mary Mac's Tea Room Website

Restaurants in Atlanta
Tourist attractions in Atlanta
Restaurants established in 1945
1945 establishments in Georgia (U.S. state)
Southern restaurants